Eddie Lund (October 12, 1909 – December 4, 1973) was a pianist and bandleader.

He grew up in Vancouver, Washington, USA, and later moved to Oregon where he worked as a pianist. He later moved to Tahiti in either 1936 or 1938 where he stayed permanently and published and released many records. He was the leader of a popular band, Eddie Lund and His Tahitians which released records on the ABC-Paramount, Decca and Tahiti labels. He picked up the Tahitian language quickly and secured a residence at Quinns night club in Papeete.

Much of Tahiti's music has been written by him. Lund has been referred to as the Irving Berlin of Island music and the father of modern Tahitian folk music. He died in 1973.

Discography
Rendezvous in Tahiti, (1954)
Lure of Tahiti, (1959)
Meet Me in Tahiti, (1961)
Eddy Lund Tahiti, (1961)
Eddy Lund Tahiti Dances, (1961)
Make Mine Tahitian, (1962)
Maori Lullabye (1962)
Echoes from a Distant Lagoon (1962)
Eddy Lund Bar Lea VE 39 (1962)
Tahitian Paradise (1963) ABC-Paramount
Eddy Lund Tahiti Mon Amour  Viking V-80 (1965)
A Night in Tahiti VE 74 (1964) 
Meet Me in Tahiti! VP 21 (?)
Let's Dance Tahitian VP60 (?)

References

External links
Eddie Lund discussed

Viking Records artists
1973 deaths
1909 births
American emigrants to French Polynesia